Bogusław Nowak (born 29 January 1952) is a former international speedway rider from Poland.

Speedway career 
Nowak won a silver medal at the Speedway World Team Cup in the 1977 Speedway World Team Cup. He also stood as reserve for the 1977 Individual Speedway World Championship after finishing eighth in the Continental final. In 1988, Nowak was involved in an accident while racing, which left him confined to a wheelchair.

World final appearances

World Team Cup
 1977 -  Wrocław, Olympic Stadium (with Edward Jancarz / Marek Cieślak / Jerzy Rembas / Ryszard Fabiszewski) - 2nd - 25pts

References 

1952 births
Polish speedway riders
Living people
Sportspeople from Gorzów Wielkopolski